Kjalvegur is a highland road in Iceland, crossing Kjölur from north to south.

History 
Formerly, the name referred to a horse-track closer to Langjökull, west of the current road. This track now goes by the name Kjalvegur hinn forni (Ancient Kjalvegur), and is closed to motorized traffic.

Geography 
The road begins in the south of Iceland near Haukadalur and behind the Gullfoss waterfall, ending in the north near Blönduós. The road traverses the interior between two glaciers, Langjökull and Hofsjökull. It is the second longest of the roads through the Highlands of Iceland. It takes about 5 hours to traverse by car, the road is generally rough, but river crossings are bridged.

See also 
 Route 35 (Iceland)
 Sprengisandsleið
 Kjölur

Roads in Iceland